Dave Kasper is an American retired soccer player and the sporting director for D.C. United.

Player
Kasper grew up in the Pittsburgh area playing for Pittsburgh Beadling. He graduated from Chartiers Valley High School. He attended the University of Maryland, playing for the Terrapins soccer team from 1983 to 1987. He graduated with a bachelor's degree in marketing. In 1988, the Los Angeles Lazers selected Kasper in the Major Indoor Soccer League draft, but did not sign him. He turned professional that year with the Milwaukee Wave of the American Indoor Soccer Association. He spent two seasons with the Wave. In 1994, Kasper signed with the expansion Pittsburgh Stingers of the Continental Indoor Soccer League. The Stingers released him on June 29, 1995.

Coach
Kasper coached the Upper St. Clair High School boys team. He also coached the Sewickley Academy soccer team from 1991 to 1994, compiling a 38–17–3 record. He also coached the Beadling U-17 team. In April 1994, Duquesne University hired him as the school's first soccer coach. However, the team did not play its first season until 1995. He had a 15–31–7 record over three seasons.

Executive
On March 16, 1998, Kasper became the vice-president and general manager of the Pittsburgh Riverhounds. In January 2001, Kasper became the director of business development for the New England Revolution of Major League Soccer. On December 20, 2001, D.C. United hired Kasper as the team's technical director. He remained in that position until September 20, 2007, when he became D.C. United's general manager.

Kasper remained the club's general manager until April 14, 2021, when he was promoted to sporting director, while Lucy Rushton was named general manager.

References

External links
 D.C. United profile

Year of birth missing (living people)
Living people
People from Bridgeville, Pennsylvania
Soccer players from Pennsylvania
American Indoor Soccer Association players
American soccer coaches
American soccer players
Continental Indoor Soccer League players
D.C. United
Major League Soccer executives
Maryland Terrapins men's soccer players
Milwaukee Wave players
Pittsburgh Beadling players
Pittsburgh Stingers players
Duquesne Dukes men's soccer coaches
Association football forwards
Pittsburgh Riverhounds SC
New England Revolution non-playing staff
D.C. United non-playing staff
Association football midfielders